Kolim (also Romanized as Kolīm; also known as Kūlīm) is a village in Poshtkuh Rural District, Shahmirzad District, Mehdishahr County, Semnan Province, Iran. At the 2006 census, its population was 41, in 21 families.

References 

Populated places in Mehdishahr County